In music theory,  the minor scale is three scale patterns – the natural minor scale (or Aeolian mode), the harmonic minor scale, and the melodic minor scale (ascending or descending) – mirroring the major scale, with its harmonic and melodic forms

In each of these scales, the first, third, and fifth scale degrees form a minor triad (rather than a major triad, as in a major scale). In some contexts, minor scale is used to refer to any heptatonic scale with this property (see Related modes below).

Natural minor scale

Relationship to relative major 
A natural minor scale (or Aeolian mode) is a diatonic scale that is built by starting on the sixth degree of its relative major scale. For instance, the A natural minor scale can be built by starting on the 6th degree of the C major scale:

Because of this, the key of A minor is called the relative minor of C major. Every major key has a relative minor, which starts on the 6th scale degree or step. For instance, since the 6th degree of F major is D, the relative minor of F major is D minor.

Relationship to parallel major 
A natural minor scale can also be constructed by altering a major scale with accidentals. In this way, a natural minor scale is represented by the following notation:

 1, 2, 3, 4, 5, 6, 7, 8

This notation is based on the major scale, and represents each degree (each note in the scale) by a number, starting with the tonic (the first, lowest note of the scale). By making use of flat symbols this notation thus represents notes by how they deviate from the notes in the major scale. Because of this, we say that a number without a flat represents a major (or perfect) interval, while a number with a flat represents a minor interval. In this example, the numbers mean:
 1 = (perfect) unison
 2 = major second
 3 = minor third
 4 = perfect fourth
 5 = perfect fifth
 6 = minor sixth
 7 = minor seventh
 8 = (perfect) octave

Thus, for instance, the A natural minor scale can be built by lowering the third, sixth, and seventh degrees of the A major scale by one semitone:

Because they share the same tonic note of A, the key of A minor is called the parallel minor of A major.

Intervals 
The intervals between the notes of a natural minor scale follow the sequence below:
 whole, half, whole, whole, half, whole, whole

where "whole" stands for a whole tone (a red u-shaped curve in the figure), and "half" stands for a semitone (a red angled line in the figure).

The natural minor scale is maximally even.

Harmonic minor scale 
=== Construction ===
The harmonic minor scale (or Aeolian 7 scale) has the same notes as the natural minor scale except that the seventh degree is raised by one semitone, creating an augmented second between the sixth and seventh degrees.

Thus, a harmonic minor scale is represented by the following notation:

 1, 2, 3, 4, 5, 6, 7, 8
A harmonic minor scale can be built by lowering the 3rd and 6th degrees of the parallel major scale by one semitone.

Because of this construction, the 7th degree of the harmonic minor scale functions as a leading tone to the tonic because it is a semitone lower than the tonic, rather than a whole tone lower than the tonic as it is in natural minor scales. The intervals between the notes of a harmonic minor scale follow the sequence below:

 whole, half, whole, whole, half, augmented second, half

Harmony 
The scale is called the harmonic minor scale because it is a common foundation for harmonies (chords) in minor keys. For example, in the key of A minor, the dominant (V) chord (the triad built on the 5th scale degree, E) is a minor triad in the natural minor scale. But when the seventh degree is raised from G to G, the triad becomes a major triad.

Chords on degrees other than V may also include the raised 7th degree, such as the diminished triad on VII itself (vii), which has a dominant function, as well as an augmented triad on III (III), which is not found in any "natural" harmony (that is, harmony that is derived from harmonizing the seven western modes, which include "major" and "minor"). This augmented fifth chord (5 chord) played a part in the development of modern chromaticism.

The triads built on each scale degree follow a distinct pattern. The roman numeral analysis is shown below.

An interesting property of the harmonic minor scale is that it contains two chords that are each generated by just one interval:
 an augmented triad (III), which is generated by major thirds
 a diminished seventh chord (vii7), which is generated by minor thirds
Because they are generated by just one interval, the inversions of augmented triads and diminished seventh chords introduce no new intervals (allowing for enharmonic equivalents) that are absent from its root position. That is, any inversion of an augmented triad (or diminished seventh chord) is enharmonically equivalent to a new augmented triad (or diminished seventh chord) in root position. For example, the triad E–G–B in first inversion is G–B–E, which is enharmonically equivalent to the augmented triad G–B–D. One chord, with various spellings, may therefore have various harmonic functions in various keys.

The seventh chords built on each scale degree follow a distinct pattern. The roman numeral analysis is shown in parentheses below.

Harmonic minor contains seven types of seventh chords: a minor major seventh chord (im(maj7)), a half-diminished seventh chord (iim7(−5)), an augmented major seventh chord (IIIaug(maj7)), a minor seventh chord (ivm7), a dominant seventh chord (V7), a major seventh chord (VImaj7), and a diminished seventh chord (viidim7). Natural minor only contains four types of seventh chords: three minor seventh chords (im7, ivm7, and vm7), a half-diminished seventh chord (iim7(-5)), two major seventh chords (IIImaj7 and VImaj7), and a dominant seventh chord (VII7).

 1st: minor-major seventh chord (i♮7)
 2nd: half diminished seventh chord (iiø7)
 3rd: augmented major seventh chord (III+7)
 4th: minor seventh chord (ivm7)
 5th: dominant seventh chord (V7)
 6th: major seventh chord (VIM7)
 7th: diminished seventh chord (viio7)

Uses 
While it evolved primarily as a basis for chords, the harmonic minor with its augmented second is sometimes used melodically. Instances can be found in Mozart, Beethoven (for example, the finale of his String Quartet No. 14), and Schubert (for example, in the first movement of the Death and the Maiden Quartet). In this role, it is used while descending far more often than while ascending. A familiar example of the descending scale is heard in a Ring of bells. A ring of twelve is sometimes augmented with a 5♯ and 6♭ to make a 10 note harmonic minor scale from bell 2 to bell 11 (for example, Worcester Cathedral).

The harmonic minor is also occasionally referred to as the Mohammedan scale as its upper tetrachord corresponds to the Hijaz jins, commonly found in Middle Eastern music. The harmonic minor scale as a whole is called Nahawand in Arabic nomenclature, as Bûselik Hicaz in Turkish nomenclature, and as an Indian raga, it is called Keeravani/Kirwani.

The Hungarian minor scale is similar to the harmonic minor scale but with a raised 4th degree. This scale is sometimes also referred to as "Gypsy Run", or alternatively "Egyptian Minor Scale", as mentioned by Miles Davis who describes it in his autobiography as "something that I'd learned at Juilliard".

In popular music, examples of songs in harmonic minor include Katy B's "Easy Please Me", Bobby Brown's "My Prerogative", and Jazmine Sullivan's "Bust Your Windows". The scale also had a notable influence on heavy metal, spawning a sub-genre known as neoclassical metal, with guitarists such as Chuck Schuldiner, Yngwie Malmsteen, Ritchie Blackmore, and Randy Rhoads employing it in their music.

Modes of harmonic minor scale 
Like Ionian (or major) scale, harmonic minor scale has seven modes, but since the character of harmonic minor is quite the same as Aeolian (natural minor), the modes from Ionian will be rearranged to be started from Aeolian.

Melodic minor scale

Construction 
The distinctive sound of the harmonic minor scale comes from the augmented second between its sixth and seventh scale degrees. While some composers have used this interval to advantage in melodic composition, others felt it to be an awkward leap, particularly in vocal music, and preferred a whole step between these scale degrees for smooth melody writing. To eliminate the augmented second, these composers either raised the sixth degree by a semitone or lowered the seventh by a semitone.

The melodic minor scale is formed by using both of these solutions. In particular, the raised sixth appears in the ascending form of the scale, while the lowered seventh appears in the descending form of the scale. Traditionally, these two forms are referred to as:
 the ascending melodic minor scale (also known as the heptatonia seconda, jazz minor scale, Athenian Scale, or Ionian 3): This form of the scale is also the 5th mode of the acoustic scale.
 the descending melodic minor scale: This form is identical to the natural minor scale .
The ascending and descending forms of the A melodic minor scale are shown below:

The ascending melodic minor scale can be notated as

 1, 2, 3, 4, 5, 6, 7, 8

while the descending melodic minor scale is

 8, 7, 6, 5, 4, 3, 2, 1

Using these notations, the two melodic minor scales can be built by altering the parallel major scale.

Intervals 
The intervals between the notes of an ascending melodic minor scale follow the sequence below:
 whole, half, whole, whole, whole, whole, half

The intervals between the notes of a descending melodic minor scale are the same as those of a descending natural minor scale.

Uses 

Composers have not been consistent in using the two forms of the melodic minor scale. Composers frequently require the lowered 7th degree found in the natural minor in order to avoid the augmented triad (III) that arises in the ascending form of the scale.

In jazz, only the ascending form of the scale is termed as "melodic minor".

In Indian Carnatic music, this melodic minor scale corresponds to the Raga Gourimanohari.

Examples of the use of melodic minor in rock and popular music include Elton John's "Sorry Seems to Be the Hardest Word", which makes, "a nod to the common practice... by the use of F [the leading tone in G minor] as the penultimate note of the final cadence." The Beatles' "Yesterday" also partly uses the melodic minor scale.

Key signature 

In modern notation, the key signature for music in a minor key is typically based on the accidentals of the natural minor scale, not on those of the harmonic or melodic minor scales. For example, a piece in E minor will have one sharp in its key signature because the E natural minor scale has one sharp (F).

Major and minor keys that share the same key signature are relative to each other. For instance, F major is the relative major of D minor since both have key signatures with one flat. Since the natural minor scale is built on the 6th degree of the major scale, the tonic of the relative minor is a major sixth above the tonic of the major scale. For instance, B minor is the relative minor of D major because the note B is a major sixth above D. As a result, the key signatures of B minor and D major both have two sharps (F and C).

Related modes 
Sometimes scales whose root, third, and fifth degrees form a minor triad are considered "minor scales". In the Western system, derived from the Greek modes, the principal scale that includes the minor third is the Aeolian mode (the natural minor scale), with the minor third also occurring in the Dorian mode and the Phrygian mode. The Dorian mode is a minor mode with a major sixth, while the Phrygian mode is a minor mode with a minor second. The Locrian mode (which is very rarely used) has a minor third but not the perfect fifth, so its root chord is a diminished triad.

Although various hemitonic pentatonic scales might be called minor, the term is most commonly applied to the relative minor pentatonic scale, derived as a mode of the major pentatonic scale, using scale tones 1, 3, 4, 5, and 7 of the natural minor scale.

See also 
 Diatonic functionality
 Jazz minor scale
 Jazz scale#Modes of the melodic minor scale
 Major scale

References

Further reading 
 Hewitt, Michael. 2013. Musical Scales of the World. The Note Tree. .
 Yamaguchi, Masaya. 2006. The Complete Thesaurus of Musical Scales, revised edition. New York: Masaya Music Services. .

External links 
 Listen to and download harmonised minor scale piano MP3s
 Natural Minor Scales explained on a virtual piano

Heptatonic scales
 
Modes (music)